Axel Eidstedt (born March 18, 1995) is a Swedish professional ice hockey defenceman. He is currently playing for Vålerenga of the GET-ligaen.

Eidstedt made his Swedish Hockey League debut playing with HV71 during the 2013–14 SHL season.

References

External links

1995 births
Living people
HV71 players
Modo Hockey players
Vålerenga Ishockey players
Swedish ice hockey defencemen
Ice hockey people from Gothenburg